Lisa Forbes may refer to:

 Lisa Forbes (politician) (born 1969), British Member of Parliament
 Lisa Forbes (beauty queen) (born 1981), American beauty queen

See also
 Forbes (disambiguation)
 Forbes (surname)
 Lisa (disambiguation)